Tommaso Ruffo (1663-1753) was an Italian archbishop of Ferrara and Cardinal.

Life

He was born in Naples, son of Carlo Ruffo, 3rd Duke of Bagnara. He was educated at La Sapienza University, becoming a doctor of canon and civil law. He was a papal diplomat, elected titular archbishop of Nicaea in 1698. On 13 Apr 1698, he was consecrated bishop by Fabrizio Spada, Cardinal-Priest of San Crisogono, with Michelangelo dei Conti, Titular Archbishop of Tarsus, and Francesco Acquaviva d'Aragona, Titular Archbishop of Larissa in Thessalia, serving as co-consecrators.

He was created cardinal-priest in 1706, despite having a cousin Giacomo Boncompagni in the College of Cardinals, with the title of S. Lorenzo in Panisperna. Having served as a papal legate, he became archbishop of Ferrara in 1717. He took part in the papal conclave, 1721 and the papal conclave, 1724. He became bishop of Palestrina in 1726 and participated in the papal conclave, 1730. He was bishop of Porto e Santa Rufina 1738. and participated in the papal conclave, 1740.  He became Dean of the College of Cardinals and bishop of Ostia e Velletri in 1740, and died in Rome in 1753. At the time of his death, he was the oldest living cardinal.

Episcopal succession

References

1663 births
1753 deaths
18th-century Italian cardinals
Bishops of Ferrara
Diplomats of the Holy See
Tommaso
Inquisitors of Malta
18th-century Italian Roman Catholic archbishops